General von Döbeln is a 1942 Swedish historical drama film directed by Olof Molander. It is a biopic of Lieutenant General and war hero Georg Carl von Döbeln.

Cast
 Edvin Adolphson as General von Döbeln
 Poul Reumert as Kronprins Karl Johan
 Eva Henning as Marianne Skjöldebrand
 Kolbjörn Knudsen as Major Canitz
 Uno Henning as Baron Anckarsvärd
 Ivar Kåge as General Sandels
 Rune Carlsten as Auditör Turdfjäll
 John Ekman as General Adlercreutz
 Åke Claesson as Prästen

References

External links
 

1942 films
1942 drama films
Swedish drama films
Swedish black-and-white films
1940s Swedish-language films
1940s Swedish films